The Yenisei Kyrgyz Khaganate was a Turkic empire that existed for about a century between the early 9th and 10th centuries. It ruled over the Yenisei Kyrgyz people, who had been located in southern Siberia since the 6th century. By the 9th century, the Kyrgyz had asserted dominance over the Uyghurs who had previously ruled the Kyrgyz. The empire was established as a khaganate from 840 to 1207, lasting 367 years. The khaganate's territory at its height would briefly include parts of modern-day China, Kazakhstan, Kyrgyzstan, Mongolia, and Russia. After the 10th century, there was little information on the Yenisei Kyrgyz. It is believed the khaganate had survived in its traditional homeland until 1207.

Periodization
693 – Bars Bek founded the state

711 – The Second Turkic Khaganate won the Battle of Sayan Mountains

758 – The Uyghur Khaganate conquers the Kyrgyz Khaganate

840 – The Kyrgyz Khaganate conquers the Uyghur Khaganate

840–924 – Imperial period

History

The earliest records of Yenisei Kyrgyz Khaganate were written during the Tang dynasty. The Kyrgyz did not keep reliable written records during this period.

Before 202 BCE, Xiongnu chanyu Modun conquered the Kyrgyzes –then known to Chinese as Gekun (鬲昆)– along with the Hunyu (渾庾), Qushe (屈射), Dingling (丁零), and Xinli (薪犁).

In 50 BC, Xiongnu chanyu Zhizhi defeated the Wusun, Wujie (Oguzes?), Dinglings and Jiankun (Kyrgyzes). During those times, Kyrgyz people lived in the Borohoro Mountains and the Manas River valley on east Tengir-Too, about 7,000 li (4,000  km) west of Ordos – the center of Xiongnu's territory.

In Chinese historiography, the Kyrgyzes' endonym was first transcribed as Gekun (or Ko-kun) or Jiankun (or Chien-kun) in Records of the Grand Historian and Book of Han, respectively. other transcriptions are Jiegu (結骨), Hegu (紇骨), Hegusi (紇扢斯), Hejiasi (紇戛斯), Hugu (護骨), Qigu (契骨), Juwu (居勿), and Xiajiasi (黠戛斯), Peter Golden reconstructs underlying *Qïrğïz < *Qïrqïz< *Qïrqïŕ and suggests a derivation from Old Turkic qïr 'gray' (horse color) plus suffix -q(X)ŕ/ğ(X)ŕ ~ k(X)z/g(X)z.

They were largely subordinate to the Göktürks from 560s to 700s. Kyrgyz khagan Bars Bek was a brother-in-law to Bilge Khagan. His son ruled Kyrgyzs after Bars Bek's defeated in hands of Qapaghan in 710. After Turkic downfall, they submitted to Uyghurs. Their leader Bayanchur killed the Kyrgyz leader and appointed a new Kyrgyz khagan named Bilge Tong Erkin (毗伽頓頡斤).

Bars Khagan
After an unsuccessful campaign against the Kyrgyz in 693, the Gokturk Khagan Qapaghan was forced to recognize the title of Khagan for the Kyrgyz ruler Bars Bek and even tried to conclude a dynastic alliance with him by marrying his "younger sister-princess" to him. However, this only temporarily dulled the most acute contradictions between the Gokturks and the Kyrgyz, who fought for dominance over Central Asia. In 707 and 709 visited the Tang Empire twice
Kyrgyz envoys. At this time, the Gokturks were at war with the Tang Empire and the Kyrgyz found themselves in a new coalition with the Türgesh, Chik, Az and Tang Empire. The greatest danger to the Gokturks during this period was represented by the Kyrgyz who gained strength. In 709, the Gokturk army defeated the Chiks and Azs,
capturing Tuva and a bridgehead for the invasion of the Kyrgyz lands. Bars Khagan did not dare to intervene, hoping for the impregnability of their lands beyond the Sayan Mountains. However, in the winter of 710–711. the Gokturk army, having made a roundabout maneuver, crossed the Sayan Range and suddenly fell upon the Kyrgyz. As a result of the defeat in Battle of Sayan Mountains, the Kyrgyz army was defeated, the Khagan Bars died. The Kyrgyz state was conquered,
Gokturk troops were stationed in the Minusinsk Basin. However, management
was handed over to the Kyrgyz ruler. Already in 711, China arrived Kyrgyz embassy. Perhaps it was sent by Bars Khagan before his death in the hope of help. In 722 and 723 two arrived in Tang Empire Kyrgyz embassies headed by tegin Isibo Sheyuzhe Bishi Sygin and
Tegin Juili Pinhezhong Sigin.

Relations with Tang dynasty 

The first embassy to Yenisei Kyrgyz was sent during reign of the Emperor Taizong of Tang, in 632. He received Kyrgyz ambassador named Shiboqu Azhan (失鉢屈阿棧) who was later appointed to the Yanran (燕然) Commandery.

The Kyrgyz khagans claimed descent from the Han dynasty general Li Ling, grandson of the general Li Guang. Li Ling was captured by the Xiongnu and defected in the first century BCE. And since the Tang imperial Li family also claimed descent from Li Guang, the Kyrgyz khagan was therefore recognized as a member of the Tang imperial family. This relationship soothed the relationship when Kyrgyz khagan Are (阿熱) invaded the Uyghur Khaganate and put Qasar Qaghan to the sword. The news brought to Chang'an by Kyrgyz ambassador Zhuwu Hesu (註吾合素).

The Yenisei Kyrgyz Khaganate of the Are family bolstered his ties and alliance to the Tang imperial family against the Uyghur Khaganate by claiming descent from the Han dynasty general Li Ling who had defected to the Xiongnu and married a Xiongnu princess, daughter of Qiedihou Chanyu and was sent to govern the Jiankun (Ch'ien-K'un) region which later became Yenisei. Li Ling was a grandson of Li Guang (Li Kuang) of the Longxi Li family descended from Laozi which the Tang dynasty Li imperial family claimed descent from. The Yenisei Kyrgyz and Tang dynasty launched a victorious successful war between 840 and 848 to destroy the Uyghur Khaganate and its centre at the Orkhon valley using their claimed familial ties as justification for an alliance. Tang forces under General Shi Xiong wounded the Uyghur Khagan (Qaghan) Ögä, seized livestock, took 5,000–20,000 Uyghur Khaganate soldiers captive, killed 10,0000 Uyghur Khaganate sources on 13 February 843 at the Battle of Shahu (kill the barbarians) mountain in 843.

In 845, Are khagan was created Zong Yingxiong Wu Chengming Khagan by Emperor Wuzong. But Wuzong died before his ambassadors departed Chang'an. The new emperor Xuanzong did not rush to create him khagan. At a general council of senior officials, they decided that the titles were given to the Uyghurs when they were strong, and if the Yenisei Kyrgyz were awarded as well, they would become proud and become dangerous. The emperor revoked the letter.

After Are's murder by one of his officials in 847, new Kyrgyz khagan was created Yingwu Chengming Khagan (英武誠明可汗) by Xuanzong, who sent Li Ye (李業) to award him the title.

Khagans

References

History of the Kyrgyz people
840 establishments
925 disestablishments
Khanates
Former countries in Chinese history
Former monarchies of Asia
Khakassia